The Coptic Orthodox Church in Wales has two churches in Wales. The first is in South Wales and the other in North Wales.

Historical background

Missionary work of the Church of Alexandria (3rd and 4th centuries)
The ecclesiastical history of the Church of Alexandria records that the Church sent missionaries, especially monastics, to the Celtic lands in the 3rd or 4th century.

Celtic tradition, especially in Ireland, suggests that the foundation of the monastic system among the Celts either partly imitated or took inspiration from the Egyptian monastic system, and that traces of Alexandrine theology remain embedded in Celtic theology. Thus both Coptic Christians and Celts can see the return of the Church of Alexandria to Celtia as of significance.

Modern presence
Although the Coptic Orthodox congregation has been present in Wales since the 1960s, the first Coptic Orthodox Church in Wales was consecrated in 1992 by Pope Shenouda III of Alexandria in  the town of Risca, South Wales.

Currently there are two Coptic Orthodox Churches in Wales.

St Mary and St Mercurius Coptic Orthodox Church

The first Coptic Orthodox Church in Wales was consecrated in 1992 by Pope Shenouda III of Alexandria in  the town of Risca, South Wales, as a church of the Coptic Orthodox Church of Alexandria. The official name of the church is St Mary's and St Abu Saifain's Coptic Orthodox Church.
 
The Church building was a Former Wesleyan Methodist church. Founded in 1837, it was rebuilt on same site on 1852 and dedicated to St John. Architect not known, the church was designed to seat 600.

The parish was later known as Trinity Methodist Church.

The church is a listed historic building (Grade II) for its well preserved architectural interest, its unusual slender arcades and especially for its fine decorative frontage.

The interior was partly converted to Coptic Orthodox liturgical use. Unusual aisled roof structure, wooden trusses rising from posts set on the very tall slender marbled columns with Corinthian derived capitals, which also support the high round arches of a wooden arcade; painted boarded ceiling. Wide moulded reredos arch and gallery. Rear raked gallery with curved and panelled front; pews on both floors retained. Vestibule has glazed panels to partition and swing doors with quarry glazing incorporating Art Nouveau motifs.

The current priest is Father Philopater Wahba

This church is under the direct supervision of Pope Shenouda III of Alexandria and he is the head of the Church's council.

Saint Mary and Saint Abasikhyron Coptic Orthodox Church
The second Coptic Orthodox Church in Llandudno Wales was bought by the Coptic Orthodox Diocese of the Midlands in 2005 under the supervision of Bishop Missael as Coptic Orthodox services began there later that year.

At first the Church did not have its own priest, therefore the mass was held there on Saturdays by a visiting priest, Father Bishoy, from the Coptic Orthodox Church in Manchester. Later the Church had its own priest, Fr. John Saleeb.

The church was consecrated by Pope Shenouda III during a visit to the UK on Saturday 29 March 2008.

See also
Coptic Orthodox Church of Alexandria
Coptic Orthodox Diocese of the Midlands and Affiliated Areas U.K.
St Mary and St Mercurius Coptic Orthodox Church
Copts
Patriarch of Alexandria
Coptic Orthodox Church in Britain and Ireland
The Holy Synod of the Coptic Orthodox Church
Oriental Orthodoxy
Egypt

References

https://web.archive.org/web/20060504043959/http://www.copticpope.org/downloads/eng_keraza/engkeraza11-02-2005.pdf

External links
St. Mary & St. Abaskhyron's Church, Llandudno, North Wales
Coptic Orthodox Diocese of the Midlands, U.K.
Churches in Llandudno

Christian denominations in Wales
Coptic Orthodox Church in the United Kingdom